Clifton Earl Heathcote (January 24, 1898 – January 18, 1939) was a center fielder in Major League Baseball who played for the St. Louis Cardinals (1918–1922), Chicago Cubs (1922–1930), Cincinnati Reds (1931–1932) and Philadelphia Phillies (1932).

Biography
Heathcote batted and threw left-handed; in a 15-season career, Heathcote posted a .275 batting average with 42 home runs, 448 RBI, and 191 stolen bases in 1415 games played. He was born in Glen Rock, Pennsylvania, and died in York, Pennsylvania, at age 40 from a pulmonary embolism.

Highlights
 Hit for the cycle on June 13, 1918.
 On May 30, 1922, the Cardinals were playing a Memorial Day doubleheader at Cubs Park. Between games, Heathcote was traded for Max Flack. Both men appeared in both games that day.
 On August 25, 1922, when the Cubs and the Philadelphia Phillies played to a 26–23 Cubs win, Heathcote set a modern National League record by reaching base seven times in a nine-inning game, and set the record (which has since been surpassed) for most runs scored in a single major league game. He went 5-for-5 (3 singles, 2 doubles) that day, also walking twice, while driving in four runs and scoring five.
 : 10 HR, 98 runs, 141 hits, and 33 doubles in 139 games – all career-highs.

See also
 List of Major League Baseball career stolen bases leaders
 List of Major League Baseball players to hit for the cycle

References

External links
, or Retrosheet
The Deadball Era

1898 births
1939 deaths
Baseball players from Pennsylvania
Chicago Cubs players
Cincinnati Reds players
Deaths from pulmonary embolism
Houston Buffaloes players
Major League Baseball center fielders
Penn State Nittany Lions baseball players
Sportspeople from York, Pennsylvania
Philadelphia Phillies players
St. Louis Cardinals players